The year 1951 in architecture involved some significant events.

Buildings and structures

Buildings

 January 2 – Federal Reserve Bank Building (Seattle), designed by William J. Bain of NBBJ, opened.
 February 19 – Mount Sinai Hospital (Minneapolis), designed by Liebenberg and Kaplan, opens.
 February 28 – Bronx River Houses completed in the Soundview section of The Bronx in New York City.
 May 3 – Festival of Britain opened in London:
 Royal Festival Hall, designed by Leslie Martin, Peter Moro and Robert Matthew.
 Dome of Discovery, designed by Ralph Tubbs.
 Skylon, designed by Philip Powell, Hidalgo Moya and Felix Samuely.
 Telecinema, designed by Wells Coates.
 Riverside Restaurant, New Schools building and Waterloo entrance tower, designed by Jane Drew with Maxwell Fry.
 The Land of Britain and The People of Britain pavilions, the Turntable Café and the "Concourse" promenade, designed by H. T. Cadbury-Brown.
 Fountain by Eduardo Paolozzi.
 '51 Bar by Leonard Manasseh and Ian Baker.
 The Lansbury Estate in Poplar is begun as a housing showcase.
 May 23 – Terrace Theatre (Minnesota), designed by Liebenberg and Kaplan, opens.
 860-880 Lake Shore Drive Apartments are completed in Chicago, by Ludwig Mies van der Rohe.
 Healy Guest House, Siesta Key, Florida, designed by Paul Rudolph and Ralph Twitchell is completed.
 The JK Building completed in Belo Horizonte, Brazil as designed by Oscar Niemeyer.
 Farnsworth House (Plano, Illinois) is completed by Ludwig Mies van der Rohe.

Events
 The antenna of the Empire State Building in New York City is added to the building.
 Nikolaus Pevsner publishes the first in his Buildings of England series for Penguin Books, the volume on Nottinghamshire.
 Norman Jewson publishes his autobiographical By Chance I did Rove.

Awards
 AIA Gold Medal – Bernard Ralph Maybeck.
 RIBA Royal Gold Medal – Vincent Harris.
 Grand Prix de Rome, architecture – Louis de Hoÿm de Marien.

Births
 July 28 – Santiago Calatrava, Spanish architect and structural engineer
 Yvonne Farrell, Irish architect

Deaths
 February 6 – William Alexander Harvey, English architect working in Birmingham (born 1874)
 July 22 – Arthur Joseph Davis, English architect (born 1878)
 Herbert Tudor Buckland, British architect working in Birmingham (born 1869)

References